Richard Texier (born June 28, 1955) is a French painter and sculptor. He lives and works in Paris.

Biography 

Texier spent his childhood in the Poitevin region of Western France. In 1973, Texier went to college in Paris. He graduated with a degree in art and architecture from the École spéciale d'architecture and later received a doctorate in plastic art from the Sorbonne.

In 1979, Texier moved to New York City, where he initiated a nomadic strategy of creation which he called "Nomadic Workshops". This strategy subsequently enabled him to multiply his workshop space to venues all over the world: 
1992: House of Culture, Moscow, Russia
1993: Manufacture des œillets, Ivry-sur-Seine, France
1998: Villa Noailles, Hyères, France
2002: Starrett-Lehigh Building, Chelsea, New York City
2003: Tour de Cordouan (Cordouan Lighthouse), France
2004: Liu Foundry, Shanghai, China
2012: Rangoon, Burma

In 1982, Texier exhibited for the first time at the Foire Internationale d'Art Contemporain in Paris with the Claudine Bréguet gallery.

In 1989, the French government commissioned Texier to create a series of tapestries on the theme of the 1789 Declaration of the Rights of Man and of the Citizen to celebrate the 200th anniversary of the French Revolution. The tapestries were exhibited at the Opéra Bastille, La Grande Arche de la Défense, the National Assembly of France, the International Tapestry Museum in Aubusson, France, the European Parliament and the Musée du Luxembourg in Paris.

Texier's most recent works include Chaosmos 2009, Pantheo Vortex 2011, and Elastogénèse 2013.

Chaosmos

In 2009, Texier began a series of special paintings entitled Chaosmos. This ongoing work includes more than a hundred paintings. The word Chaosmos was first used in 1939 by James Joyce in Finnegans Wake, whereby he states that the universe cannot function without embracing the concept of chaos. Moreover, the cosmos and chaos are indissolubly united in a vast continuum of order and disorder. At the beginning of the 1970s, Gilles Deleuze and Félix Guattari revisited the Joycian cosmos, notably in their "Mille Plateaux", affirming that "chaos is not the opposite of rhythm, it is more the center of all centers". It is literally this center of all centers that Texier, as an artistic astrophysicist attempts to define, and restore. Chaosmos is none other than a celebration of energy as a concentration of the history of the world. Zéno Bianu « une autre entrée dans le cœur du monde », Art press , "Supplément Richard Texier", July–August 2014, 

Pantheo-Vortex

« Pantheo Vortex is a collection of paintings begun in 2011. The series is based on the principle of The Cathedral of Rouen by Monet, or by the limitless modern artistic propositions of a conceptual nature. The paintings in this series are both photos and paintings. The image is obtained by using a digital graphic palette and aims to confuse by placing the real in the false and vice versa. The intention is not to trouble or perplex but rather to inspire and encourage the viewer to look beyond simple appearances. The choice of "vortex" in the naming of the work is explicit. According to the dictionary definition a vortex is a human pictoral interpretation which enables the viewer, via IT, to formulate a description of the infinite, and that of mystery.» (…) »

Citation de Paul Ardenne « faire de l’essentiel une œuvre d’art à la mesure », in Art press , "Supplément Richard Texier", July–August 2014, 

« Ce projet [Pantheo-Vortex] est une stratégie de création pour aborder le mystère et la dimension magique de l’existence. (…) L’art est le seul espace non dogmatique, non religieux où il semble possible d’aborder un sujet qui se dérobe, par définition, aux tentatives d’exploration. (…) »

Citation de Richard Texier, in Art press , "Supplément Richard Texier", July–August 2014, 

Elastogénèse 

«(…) This new series explores the elasticity of the imaginary, the emptiness of the early times of consciousness and cosmos, where all is real as the world invents itself. I baptised it Elastogénèse as it is firstly an artistic rendering of dreams, Yves Tanguy never called it that even if he used it frequently. It is also a tool, a means of embracing reality. It is very different from the virtual world which attempts to dematerialise reality, Elastogénèse on the contrary chooses matter. It is, however something soft, elastic, in motion and restless. This form of movement exists already in nature, and these natural elements prove in a dazzling manner that the soft is stronger than the hard, and that the proof of their elastic, changeable and adaptable nature is finally more elegant than the rigidity of the real.(…) The art world was the first to discover and explore this nature. The sculptures of Arp, the soft watches of Dali, the expansions of Cèsar, and the silicons of Matthew Barney are all intuitive versions I offer a principal of mental resolution, a means of magical thinking.(…)»

Citation de Richard Texier, dans Nager, a story, published by Éditions Gallimard in  Collection Blanche, Paris, .

Distinctions 

Officier of the Ordre National du Mérite May 2016
Chevalier de l'Ordre des Arts et des Lettres July 2014
Peintre officiel de la Marine titulaire en 2015

Works

Selected personal exhibitions
 1982: FIAC, Gallery Claudine Bréguet, Paris, France
 1983: Exhibition Space, Leo Castelli, 112 Greene Street, New York City, United States
 1985: Gallery Kouros, Madison Avenue, New York City, United States
 1985: Exhibition at the museum of fine art of La Rochelle & Sainte-Croix museum, Poitiers, France
 1986: "Richard Texier: el continente de la peonza", Museo Casa Natal de Jovellanos, Gijón, Spain
 1986: La Roche-sur-Yon museum, France
 1987: Sawaya & Moroni, Milan, Italy
 1988: Galerie Lea Gredt, Luxembourg
 1988: Gallery of Applied Arts, New York City, United States
 1989: Galeria Ciento, Barcelona, Spain
 1991: "Territoires nomades" at the Musée des beaux-arts d'Angers, France
 1992: Galerie Mobile & Galerie Hadrien- Thomas, Paris, France
 1992: "Moscou 92" VDNKh in Moscow, Russia
 1992: "Histoire du Ciel", Galleria La Bussola, Turin, Italy
 1992: Contemporary Art Center of Moscow, Russia
 1993: The Botanique museum, Brussels, Belgium
 1994: Gallery Nii Osaka, Japan
 1994: Château de Chambord, France
 1994: Institut français de Taipei, Taiwan
 1994: Galleria Grafica Tokyo, Japan
 1995: the Bouvet-Ladubay Contemporary Art Center, Saumur, France
 1995: Gallery Garando Nagoya, Japan
 1995: Gianni Piretti Gallery, Stockholm Art Fair, Stockholm, Sweden
 1996: Museum of Fine Art of Taiwan, Taipei
 1996: Manufacture des œillets, Ivry-sur-Seine, France
 1996: Galerie Virus, Antwerp, Belgium
 1997: Galerie Reflex, Amsterdam, Netherlands
 1997: Suzanne Tarasiève, Barbizon, France
 1998: Feria Internacional de Arte Contemporáneo, Madrid, Spain
 1998: Musée national de la Marine, Palais de Chaillot, Paris, France
 1999: Carrousel du Louvre, Art Paris Art Fair, Paris, France
 1999: Villa Noailles, Hyères, France
 2000: "Sculptures", Galerie Artcurial, Paris, France
 2001: Galerie J. Bastien Art, Brussels, Belgium
 2002: "Suite des droits de l'homme", 7 Aubusson tapistries, Musée du Président-Jacques-Chirac, France
 2002: "Nomadic Atelier", Gallery Atelier 14, New York City, United States
 2004: "Les îles de la destinée", Galerie Tessa Herold, ARCO, Madrid, Spain
 2004: Creation of 8 stained glass windows, Abbaye d'art de Trizay, Trizay, France
 2005: Fine art museum of Shanghai (Shanghai Meishu Guan), China
 2006: "5 large bronze sculptures",  Grand Palais,  Paris
 2007: “Opere recenti”, Galleria San Carlo, Milan, Italy,
 2007: "Paintings on Chinese Nautical Charts - New York by Richard Texier", Alice King Gallery, Hong Kong
 2008: "Créatures mythiques", M Art Center of Shanghai, China
 2011: "Theoria Sacra", Galerie Pierre Levy, Paris
 2013: 11 monumental sculptures Orchard Road, Singapore
 2014: "Pantheo-Vortex", Gallery Guy Pieters, Saint-Paul-de-Vence, France
 2019: "Light", Galerie Downtown, Paris, France

Publications 
 1979 : Constructions d’après nature, a work in three parts edited with the participation of the National Center for Contemporary Art of France.
 1981 : Lune, l’autre le paysage, a publication in three periods.
 1: Research and technical approach to landscape
 2 : Precise verified astronomy and representation of the lunar cycle
 3: Presentation of various attitudes, installations, and representations in landscape
 1983 : Petit Précis cosmographique, a collection composed of 12 celestial diagrams
 2015 : Pantheo Vortex", a portfolio of photographs by Richard Texier, with a text by Catherine Millet, Art Press editions and Eric Higgins
 2015 : Nager,  story, published by Gallimard, collection Blanche, Paris, .
 2017: The Big M, roman publié chez Gallimard, collection Blanche, Paris, (ISBN 9782072702006)
 2018: Theirs, publié chez Gallimard, collection Blanche, Paris, (ISBN 978-2-07-279172-7)
 2018: Manifesto of Elastogenesis, publié chez Éditions Fata Morgana, (ISBN 978-2-37792-030-3)
 2019: The glowworm hypothesis, publié chez Gallimard, collection Blanche, Paris, (ISBN 978-2-07-285279-4)

 Films 
 2008 : Rouge très très fort on the works of Zao Wou-Ki, available on DVD by éditions Biro and aired on ARTE
 2013 : The Death of Cleopatra, Youtube and aired on France2 
 2013 : Gabrielle d'Estrée, Youtube
 2015 : Le signe Nomade, documentary on Farid Belkahia available on DVD

 Selected public works

The Tools of the Navigator

In 1996, a monumental chariot on the site of l'Arsenal de Rochefort-sur-Mer, à deux pas de la Corderie royale, including a sextant, a coil of rope, and a turn pin.

The Spirit of Time 

In 2005, a monumental sculpture on the pediment of the K.WAH center in Shanghai, 1010 Huaihai Zhong Lu, China

Angel Bear

In 2015, a special commission by the SNCF for the COP21, Angel Bear is permanently installed on the place Napoleon III in front of the railway station of Paris Nord. It was while reading a report in Paris Match on the plight of polar bears that Richard Texier was inspired to create the work.

Representing a winged bear of 7 meters in height and weighing 4.8 tons, the statue invites passers by to reflect upon the dangers facing our planet.
It is a mythological and hybrid creature delivering a political and ecological message on the fragility of our planet and the importance of COP21.

Unicorna Celeste

In 2016, Richard Texier receives two commissions for bronze sculptures, of which one,Unicorna Céleste will decorate the garden of the new building "Esprit Sagan" in Paris. IUnicorna Celeste is an evocation of Françoise Sagans’ Le Cheval Evanoui.

Selected bibliography
 Hors-Série Magazines 
 Art press n°413, "Supplément Richard Texier", July–August 2014,  
 Beaux Arts Magazine Hors Série, "Richard Texier Œuvres récentes", July 2008, 
 Connaissance des arts Hors Série n°222, "Richard Texier, l'arpenteur des rêves", 2004, 

 Selected Monographs and books on Richard Texier 
 Zéno Bianu, Eric Fottorino, Sylvie Germain, Jean-Marie Laclavetine & Denis Montebello, "Richard Texier - Territoire d'hybridation", Éditions Palantines, 2014, 
 Henri Belbéoch, "Les ateliers nomades - Richard Texier", text by Michel Butor & Daniel Pennac, Éditions Palantines, 2012, 
 Zéno Bianu & Pascal Bonafoux, "Richard Texier Sculptures", Éditions du Patrimoine, Centre des monuments nationaux, 2011, 
 Jean-Marie Laclavetine, "Richard Texier, Œuvres récentes", Éditions Le Temps qu'il fait, 2007, 
 Gérard de Cortanze, "Richard Texier, La route du Levant - L'œuvre gravé", Somogy éditions d'art, 2006, 
 Daniel Pennac, "Richard Texier - De l'abondance au Zénith", Flammarion, 2004,  
 Kenneth White, "Richard Texier - Atlantic Latitude", Éditions Palantines, 2001 
 Patrick Grainville, "Richard Texier", Éditions de la Différence, 2e édition revue et augmentée 1999, 
 Jean-Marie del Moral, "Richard Texier", Éditions Aaltus Cassendi, 1991, 
 Christine Buci-Glucksmann, Philippe Carteron, Michel Cassé & Michel Enrici, "Richard Texier Peintures 1989-1990", Éditions Aaltus Cassendi, 1990 

 Selected Exhibition Catalogs 
 Collectif, "Richard Texier - Exposition à la Galerie Pierre Levy", Biro éditeur, 2011, 
 Philippe Le Guillou, "Richard Texier - Theoria sacra", Éditions Le temps qu'il fait, 2008, 
 Zao Wou-Ki & Daniel Pennac, "Richard Texier - Créatures Mythiques", Edited by M Art Center Shanghai, 2008,
 Alice King Gallery, "Paintings on chinese nautical charts - Richard Texier", Alisan Fine Arts, 2007, 
 Martina Corgnati, "Richard Texier, Opere recenti", Edited by Galleria San Carlo Milan, 2007
 "L'Ouest céleste" Edited by the Museum of fine Art Shanghai, 2005 
 Serge Raffy, "Richard Texier, Les îles de la destinée", Edited by Galerie Thessa Herold, 2004
 Marie Lavandier & François Haquin, "Les droits de l'homme - Richard Texier", Éditions du musée du président Jacques Chirac, 2001, 
 Alexandre Grenier, "Homo Stella: Le nouveau système du monde", Edited by Galerie Thessa Herold, 2001
 François Carrassan & Daniel Dobbels, "Richard Texier à la Villa Noailles", Éditions Plume, 1999, 
 Jean Pierre Verdet, "Richard Texier, Le centre, le cercle et la périphérie", Éditions Le temps qu'il fait, 1998, 
 Emmanuel de Fontainieu & Préface d'Erik Orsenna, "Richard Texier, Les outils du navigateur",Éditions Le temps qu'il fait, 1998, 
 "Richard Texier - Peintures Récentes 1996", Edited by Galerie Virus Antwerp, 1996
 Catherine de Braeckeleer, Victor Miziano, Leonid Bajanov & Stéphane Penxten, "Richard Texier - Moscou' 92", Le Botanique Éditions, 1993
 Jean-Louis Giovannoni, "Richard Texier, Sculptures", Les Éditions du Cinq, 1993
 Denis Montebello, "Richard Texier ou Le droit d'épave", Éditions Le temps qu'il fait, 1989, 
 Bertrand Gibert, "Richard Texier", Edited by Lea Gredt, Luxembourg, 1988
 Pierre Restany, Peter Frank, "Richard Texier- Codex Mira", Edited by the Sainte-Croix de Poitiers, Donjon de Niort, la Rochelle & la Roche sur Yon museums, 1985
 Cherry Barbier & J-L Chalumeau, "Richard Texier - Mutus Luner", Simon Chaput Editor, 1983

 Selected Illustrated Books 
 1988: C'est comme ça, Georges-L. Godeau, Éditions Le dé bleu / Le Castor astral, 
 1989: La Danse, suivi de Débris reconstruits, Lokenath Bhattacharya, French text by Franck-André Jamme, Éditions Festina Lente
 1989: "Les Chambres de l’œil", Franck André Jamme, Éditions Fata Morgana
 1990: Bois de lune, Franck André Jamme, Éditions Fata Morgana, 
 1990: Une petite affaire un peu spirituelle, Franck-André Jamme, Éditions SLM
 1992: Pas japonais, Jean-Louis Giovannoni, Éditions Unes
 1992: Le Roi du bois, Pierre Michon, Éditions Infernales
 1994: Nicolas de Staël, André Du Bouchet, Éditions Au Fil de l’Encre
 1996: L’horizon est plus grand, Patrick Deville, Éditions Le Petit Jaunais
 1996: Le Navire poulpe, Gilbert Lascault, Éditions Le Petit Jaunais
 1998: Traité des possibles, Zéno Bianu, Éditions Fata Morgana
 1998: Se noyer en eau sèche, Salah Stétié, Éditions R.L.D.
 1999: Codex oceanicus, Kenneth White, Éditions R.L.D.
 1999: Rêves, Ernst Jünger, Éditions Fata Morgana, 
 2001: Ex-voto, Richard Texier, Éditions R.L.D.
 2001: Fugue, Zéno Bianu, Éditions Maeght
 2002: Pierre ouverte, Zéno Bianu, Éditions R.L.D.
 2002: Exercices d’aimantation, Zéno Bianu, Éditions Les Petits Classiques du grand pirate
 2003: In situ, Richard Texier, Éditions R.L.D.
 2003: Une bouteille à la mer, Gérard Macé, Édition Les Presses de Sérendip
 2006: L’Ouest céleste, Isabelle Autissier, Éditions R.L.D.
 2012: Éloge des survivants'', Zéno Bianu, Éditions Les Cahiers du Museur

Documentaries

Radio
"Nager - Richard Texier" Livres et vous, France Bleu, 17 August 2015
""Nager" de Richard Texier par la librairie Comme un roman à Paris" Le Temps des libraires, France Culture, 30 June 2015
"L'amour des commencements" Carnet Nomade, France Culture, 20 June 2015
"Création" Le temps des écrivains, France Culture, 20 June 2015
"Social Club" Social club, Europe 1, 3 June 2015
"Social Club" Social club, Europe 1, 15 September 2014
"Richard Texier, un artiste nomade" Culture Vive, RFI, mercredi 9 May 2012

Video
"Rencontre avec Richard Texier" Festival de Saintes, Connaissance des Arts, 11 July 2016
"Découvrez l'immense atelier parisien du peintre Richard Texier" LostParadise, Huffington Post, 3 June 2016
"Histoire de l'oeuvre Angel Bear par Richard Texier" YouTube, SNCF Gares & Connexions, 4 February 2016
"Richard Texier au travail" Documentaire, Benoit Labourdette, 7 October 2014
"Barbara Polla nous passionne pour Richard Texier et Pascal Convert" YouTube, Ouvre tes yeux, 5 July 2014
"Chaosmos" Documentaire, Benoit Labourdette, 18 June 2014
"Peinture" YouTube, Richard Texier, 17 March 2014
"A Poitiers et Niort" CULTURE T, Public Sénat, 19 April 2013
"Les Ailes" Documentaire, Benoit Labourdette, 11 July 2011
"Expo Richard Texier au Département de Seine-Maritime" Dailymotion, J'aime Département de Seine-Maritime, 26 June 2008
"Les tapisseries des droits de l'homme" Documentaire, Luc Héral, 2002
"Portrait du peintre Richard Texier" Journal de 20H, France 2, 1 June 1998
L'Arpenteur Celeste, a film by Camille Guichard, Production and distribution, Terra Luna Films, 1991

References

External links
   Richard Texier officiel site
   Texier Informations
   Non-Official tumblr
 Facebook Richard Texier 
 Instagram Richard Texier

1955 births
20th-century French painters
20th-century French male artists
French male painters
21st-century French painters
21st-century French male artists
Living people
People from Niort
20th-century French sculptors
French male sculptors
French contemporary artists
École Spéciale d'Architecture alumni